McCardell is a surname. Notable people with the surname include:

Archie McCardell (1926–2008), American businessman
Claire McCardell (1905–1958), American fashion designer
John McCardell, Jr. (born 1949), American academic
Keenan McCardell (born 1970), American football player
Roger McCardell (1932–1996), American baseball player
Roy McCardell (1870-?), American journalist and humorist
Sandra McCardell, Canadian diplomat

See also

Chloe McCardel (born 1985), Australian long-distance swimmer
McCarrell